In enzymology, a trehalose O-mycolyltransferase is an enzyme that catalyzes the chemical reaction

2 alpha,alpha-trehalose 6-mycolate  alpha,alpha-trehalose + alpha,alpha-trehalose 6,6'-bismycolate

Hence, this enzyme has one substrate, alpha,alpha'-trehalose 6-mycolate, and two products, alpha,alpha-trehalose and alpha,alpha'-trehalose 6,6'-bismycolate.

This enzyme belongs to the family of transferases, specifically those acyltransferases transferring groups other than aminoacyl groups.  The systematic name of this enzyme class is alpha,alpha-trehalose-6-mycolate:alpha,alpha-trehalose-6-mycolate 6'-mycolyltransferase. Other names in common use include alpha,alpha'-trehalose 6-monomycolate:alpha,alpha'-trehalose, mycolyltransferase, alpha,alpha'-trehalose-6-mycolate:alpha,alpha'-trehalose-6-mycolate, and 6'-mycolyltransferase.

References

 

EC 2.3.1
Enzymes of unknown structure